Crambidia impura is a moth of the family Erebidae. It was described by William Barnes and James Halliday McDunnough in 1913. There are two disjunct populations. It has been recorded from southern Rocky Mountain states, the Yukon and northern British Columbia and Alberta. The habitat consists of stabilized sand dunes dominated by open jack pine forests.

Adults are light grey. Adults are on wing from August to September.

The larvae probably feed on lichens.

References

Lithosiina
Moths described in 1913
Moths of North America